Berdalen is a village in Bykle municipality in Agder county, Norway. The village is located in the Setesdalen valley, along the river Otra and the Norwegian National Road 9. The mountains (from north to south) include Gråsteinsnosi, Brandsnutene, Svolhusgreini, Sæbyggjenuten, and Støylsdalsnutene.

The small village grew up around three farms that have been in use since before the year 1350, possibly back to the Viking Age.  The village gained many new homesteads during the 20th century and by 1991, there were at least 27 farms and residences in the small village.

References

Villages in Agder
Bykle